The sixth season of the Australian police-drama Blue Heelers premiered on the Seven Network on 10 February 1999 and aired on Wednesday nights at 8:30 PM. The 42-episode season concluded 24 November 1999.

Casting
Main cast for this season consisted of:
 John Wood as Senior Sergeant Tom Croydon
 Julie Nihill as Chris Riley
 Martin Sacks as Senior Detective P.J. Hasham
 Lisa McCune as Acting Sergeant / Senior Constable Maggie Doyle
 Tasma Walton as Constable Dash McKinley (episodes 1–23)
 Paul Bishop as Senior Constable / Acting Sergeant Ben Stewart
 Rupert Reid as Probationary Constable Jack Lawson
 Jane Allsop as Probationary Constable Jo Parrish (episodes 28–42)

Guest actors this season included Kate Hood, Jason Clarke, Terence Donovan, Lisa Crittenden, Grant Piro, Norman Yemm, Robert Grubb, Margot Knight, Arianthe Galani, Jeremy Angerson, Louise Siversen, Lois Ramsay, Mary Ward and Roger Oakley.

Awards

Episodes

DVD release

Notes

References

General
 Zuk, T. Blue Heelers: 1999 episode guide, Australian Television Information Archive. Retrieved 1 August 2007.
 TV.com editors. Blue Heelers Episode Guide - Season 6, TV.com. Retrieved 1 August 2007.
Specific

Blue Heelers seasons
1999 Australian television seasons